, son of Kanehira, was a court noble (kugyo) of the Kamakura period. He held the regent positions of Kampaku from 1296 to 1298 and Sessho since 1298. In 1301 he retired and became a priest. Regent Fuyuhira was his son. Also, Motonori was Fuyutsune's adopted son.

External links
 https://web.archive.org/web/20070927231943/http://nekhet.ddo.jp/people/japan/fstakatukasa.html
 https://web.archive.org/web/20070812194902/http://www015.upp.so-net.ne.jp/gofukakusa/daijiten-konoe-takatukasake.htm

1262 births
1301 deaths
Fujiwara clan
Takatsukasa family
People of Kamakura-period Japan